i30, I30, i-30 or I-30 may refer to:

Interstate 30, an Interstate Highway in the southern United States
, an Imperial Japanese Navy submarine during World War II
 (1940-1968), a Royal Australian Navy Tribal-class destroyer
I30, a 9000 server model of computer system produced by the Hewlett-Packard (HP) company
Hyundai i30, a small family car made by Korean automaker Hyundai Motor Company
Infiniti I30, mid-size luxury car sold under Nissan's Infiniti marque in North American markets
Korg i30, a 1998 keyboard instrument
IBM NetVista Internet Appliance i30, allows internet access on a TV
I-30 (aircraft), a prototype of the Yakovlev Yak-3